"Bonfire" is a song by German DJ and record producer Felix Jaehn. It was released on 15 July 2016 and features vocals by Finnish singer and songwriter Alma. The song was written by Jaehn, Alma, Joseph Walter and Pascal Reinhardt, and produced by Jaehn and Hitimpulse.

Charts

Weekly charts

Year-end charts

Certifications

References

2016 singles
2016 songs
Felix Jaehn songs
Songs written by Alma (Finnish singer)
Alma (Finnish singer) songs